Fantasía flamenca de Paco de Lucía (Paco de Lucía's Flamenco Fantasy) is the second solo studio album by Paco de Lucía.

Track listing

"Aires de Linares" – 6:04
"Mi inspiración" – 3:09
"Guajiras de Lucía” – 3:21
"Mantilla de feria" (Esteban Sanlúcar) – 3:17
"El tempul" – 3:28
"Panaderos flamencos" (Esteban Sanlúcar) – 2:37
"Generalife bajo la luna" – 4:41
"Fiesta en Moguer" – 3:16
"Lamento minero" – 4:21
"Celosa" – 3:08

Musicians
Paco de Lucía – Flamenco guitar

References
 Gamboa, Manuel José and Nuñez, Faustino. (2003). Paco de Lucía. Madrid: Universal Music Spain.

1969 albums
Paco de Lucía albums
Universal Music Spain albums